8th Reconnaissance Squadron may refer to:
 The 887th Tactical Missile Squadron, designated the 8th Reconnaissance Squadron (Light) from January 1941 to August 1941
 The 98th Air Refueling Squadron, designated the 8th Reconnaissance Squadron (Medium) from February 1942 to April 1942
 The 8th Reconnaissance Squadron, Special (Provisional), from March 1944 - August 1944 (a predecessor of the 654th Bombardment Squadron)

See also 
 The 8th Photographic Reconnaissance Squadron
 The 8th Tactical Reconnaissance Squadron (July 1945 - February 1946)
 The 8th Tactical Reconnaissance Squadron (August 1948 - 1951)
 The 8th Weather Reconnaissance Squadron, Heavy (Provisional), from March 1944 - August 1944 (a predecessor of the 652d Bombardment Squadron)
 The 8th Weather Reconnaissance Squadron, Light (Provisional), from March 1944 - August 1944 (a predecessor of the 653d Bombardment Squadron)